The Philippine drongo-cuckoo (Surniculus velutinus) is a bird of the cuckoo family found only in the Philippines. It belongs to the genus Surniculus along with the Asian drongo-cuckoo (S. lugubris). The two were previously classified as a single species but are now often separated based on differences in calls and juvenile plumage.

The black bill is slender and curved and the tail is fairly long and slightly forked. The plumage is mostly glossy blue-black apart from a white bar on the underwing and white marks on the thigh feathers and on the underside of the tail. Young birds are duller than the adults but otherwise similar unlike young Asian drongo-cuckoos which are spotted white. The call is a repeated series of 8 or 9 ascending notes.

It inhabits the canopy and middle storey of lowland forest. It is usually shy and solitary. There are two subspecies: S. v. velutinus on Mindanao, Samar, Leyte, Bohol and the Sulu Archipelago and S. v. chalybaeus on Luzon, Mindanao and Negros. On Palawan, the species is replaced by Asian drongo-cuckoos of the race minimus.

Little is known about its breeding habits. It is likely to be a brood parasite laying its eggs in the nests of other birds but its host species are unknown.

References
Kennedy, Robert S.; Gonzales, Pedro C.; Dickinson, Edward C.; Miranda, Hector C. & Fisher, Timothy H. (2000) A Guide to the Birds of the Philippines, Oxford University Press, Oxford.
Lowther, Peter E. (2007) Host list of avian brood parasites - 2 - Cuculiformes; Cuculidae. Accessed 12/09/07.

External links

Oriental Bird Images: Philippine Drongo-Cuckoo

Philippine drongo-cuckoo
Birds of the Philippines
Endemic birds of the Philippines
Philippine drongo-cuckoo